Katrina Brown is a Professor of Social Sciences, at the University of Exeter.  From 1991–2012, she was a Professor of Development Studies at the University of East Anglia.

Education 
Brown has a BSc from University of Newcastle upon Tyne, an MSc from the University of Reading, and a Ph.D. from the University of Nottingham. Following her Ph.D, she was at the University of East Anglia until 2012 at which point she moved to the University of Exeter.

Career
Her areas of expertise include examinations of women's collective action and coping strategies in semi-arid Kenya, and environmental change, biodiversity and conservation. In 2016, she published the book Resilience, Development and Global Change that rethinks resilience concepts for development studies and practice.

She was formerly an editor of the journal Global Environmental Change, a member of the Resilience Alliance on the Scientific Committee of the IHDP, and was the lead author of the Millennium Ecosystem Assessment. She was also the Director of the Programme on Climate Change and International Development and Deputy Director for Social sciences at the Tyndall Centre for Climate Change Research.

Awards and honors 

 AXA Outlook Award (2013)
 Doctor Honoris Causa, University of Wageningen, Netherlands (2013)
 Fellow, Academy of Social Sciences (2018)

References 

Year of birth missing (living people)
Living people
Alumni of the University of Nottingham
Academics of the University of Exeter
Development specialists
British women non-fiction writers
Fellows of the Academy of Social Sciences